Centennial International is a Canadian music variety television miniseries which was broadcast on CBC Television in 1967.

Premise
The series was produced for the Canadian Centennial with episodes representing the regions of the world from which Canadians trace their heritage.

Scheduling
The half-hour series was broadcast on Fridays at 8:00 pm (Eastern) from 18 August to 1 September 1967, with a final episode on 7 September 1967 at 10:30 pm..

Episodes
 Mediterranean nations: starring Sergio Franchi (Italy), folk dancers The Tanets (Greece), Ivan Romanoff orchestra and chorus, and Ahuva Shai (Israel)
 Britain: hosted by George Murray, starring Barry Morse, the 48th Highlanders of Canada pipe and drum corps, Emerald Isle Step Dancers, St. David United Welsh Choir and Irish singer Anne Linden
 Caribbean and Latin America: hosted by Elwood Glover, starring Chicho Valle and orchestra, Los Compadres (Mexico), Chico Simon and his quintet (Haiti), Dick Smith (Jamaica), Nilda (Argentina)
 Europe: hosted by Jan Rubeš, starring Edita Symonek (Germany), Isabel Santos (Portugal), Zemplin Slovak Dancers (Czechoslovakia) and a return of Ivan Romanoff's music group

References

External links
 

CBC Television original programming
1967 Canadian television series debuts
1967 Canadian television series endings
Canadian Centennial